Spielvogel is a surname. Notable people with the surname include:

Alice Mae (nee Buschmann) Spielvogel, singer of the barbershop quartet, The Chordettes
Barbaralee Diamonstein-Spielvogel, American author and activist
Carl Spielvogel (1928–2021), businessman and former ambassador
Jackson J. Spielvogel, American professor and author
Nathan Spielvogel (1874–1956), Australian schoolteacher and author

Surnames from nicknames